Aaron Peterson (born September 25, 1970) is a former Democratic-Farmer-Labor Party member of the Minnesota House of Representatives, having represented District 20A in southwestern Minnesota. From the town of Madison, Peterson was first elected in 2002 and served three terms, leaving office in January 2009.

Peterson has expressed interest in one day running for the United States Senate.

References 
"Aaron Peterson." Carroll's State Directory. Carroll Publishing, 2006. Reproduced in Biography Resource Center. Farmington Hills, Mich.: Thomson Gale. 2006

External links

 Minnesota Public Radio Votetracker: Rep. Aaron Peterson
 Rep. Aaron Peterson 2005 Session Update

Living people
1970 births
People from Madison, Minnesota
Democratic Party members of the Minnesota House of Representatives
21st-century American politicians